"No More Lonely Nights" is a song written and performed by Paul McCartney, first released on 24 September 1984 on the soundtrack Give My Regards to Broad Street (1984).

Release
Two versions of the single on both 7" and 12", and a 12" picture disc, were issued in both the UK and US. The first 7" version featured "No More Lonely Nights" backed with the playout version. The second featured the Arthur Baker Dance Mix as the B-side.

The power ballad reached number 6 in the US and number 2 in the UK. It was included on McCartney's double album compilation, All the Best! (1987), Wingspan: Hits and History (2001) and Pure McCartney (2016).

Reception
Cash Box called the song a "heartwarming ballad" that is "tender and atmospheric."  Billboard said "No surprises, but eminently satisfying."

Stephen Thomas Erlewine of AllMusic said the song was "an absolutely lovely mid-tempo tune graced by a terrific David Gilmour guitar solo." In a radio interview prior to 1990's Knebworth concerts, Gilmour told Jim Ladd that "No More Lonely Nights" was the last thing McCartney recorded for the film, and that he told McCartney to give his session fee to a charity of his choice.

Track listings
7" single – UK, 1984
 "No More Lonely Nights"
 "No More Lonely Nights" (playout version)

7" single
 "No More Lonely Nights"
 "No More Lonely Nights" (special dance mix)

12" single – UK, 1984
 "No More Lonely Nights" (extended version)
 "Silly Love Songs" (remake)
 "No More Lonely Nights" (ballad)

12" single
 "No More Lonely Nights" (special dance mix by Arthur Baker)
 "No More Lonely Nights" (special dance edit)

Charts and certifications

Weekly charts

Year-end charts

Certifications

Official versions
No More Lonely Nights (Ballad) [produced by George Martin]
 5:13 – CD Album Version (includes dialogue from the movie)
 4:42 – LP/Vinyl Album Version (includes dialogue from the movie)
 4:47 – Wingspan: Hits and History version (7" version with longer fadeout)
 4:36 – 7" Version (clean introduction)
 0:13 – Ballad Reprise

No More Lonely Nights (Playout Version) [produced by Arthur Baker]
 5:03 – CD Album Version
 4:26 – LP/Vinyl Album Version
 3:58 – 7" Version
 No More Lonely Nights (Extended Version) – 8:10
 No More Lonely Nights (Special Dance Edit) – 4:22
 No More Lonely Nights (Special Dance Mix) (aka Extended Playout Version) – 6:55

Personnel
 Paul McCartney – lead vocal, piano
 Linda McCartney – backing vocal, keyboards
 Eric Stewart – backing vocal
 David Gilmour – guitar
 Herbie Flowers  – bass
 Anne Dudley – synthesizer
 Stuart Elliott – drums

Notes

External links
 Lyrics of this song
 

Songs about nights
1984 singles
Paul McCartney songs
Parlophone singles
Song recordings produced by George Martin
Songs written by Paul McCartney
Columbia Records singles
Music published by MPL Music Publishing
Rock ballads
1984 songs
Songs about loneliness
1980s ballads